Passmore is a surname. Notable people with the surname include:

Deborah Griscom Passmore (1840–1911), botanical illustrator for the U.S. Department of Agriculture
George Passmore (born 1942), of the artists Gilbert and George
George Passmore (lacrosse) (1889–1952), American lacrosse player
John Passmore (1914–2004), Australian philosopher
John Passmore (artist) (1904–1984), Australian artist
Lori Passmore, Canadian/British scientist
Matt Passmore (born 1973), Australian actor
Norman Passmore (1915–2003), American football coach
Rhianon Passmore (born 1972), British politician
Steve Passmore (born 1973), Canadian former professional ice hockey goaltender
Tim Passmore (born 1959), British police and crime commissioner
Todd Passmore (born 1970), better known as Barry Houston, American semi-retired professional wrestler
Walter Passmore (1867–1946), English singer and actor
William L. Passmore (1910–2002), American jockey and horse trainer
William T. Passmore (1882–1955), American lacrosse player
William Passmore (boxer) (1915–1986), South African boxer

English-language surnames
Welsh-language surnames
Surnames of British Isles origin
fr:Passmore